Caitriona Mary Beggs (born 15 July 1977) is an Irish former cricketer who played as a right-handed batter and occasional wicket-keeper. She appeared in one Test match and 61 One Day Internationals (ODIs) for Ireland between 1995 and 2008. She also played two matches for Northern Districts in 2008.

With 1,217 runs, she is Ireland's third-highest run-scorer in ODIs. In Ireland's only Test match, Beggs top-scored in her side's only innings with 68* as Ireland won by an innings and 54 runs.

References

External links
 
 

1977 births
Living people
Cricketers from Dublin (city)
Ireland women One Day International cricketers
Ireland women Test cricketers
Northern Districts women cricketers
Wicket-keepers